Vinateros is an administrative neighborhood (barrio) of Madrid belonging to the district of Moratalaz. As of 1 March 2020, it has a population of 17,225.

References 

Wards of Madrid
Moratalaz